Lovers of the Red Sky is a 2021 South Korean television series starring Kim Yoo-jung, Ahn Hyo-seop, Gong Myung, and Kwak Si-yang. It is directed by Jang Tae-yoo and written by Ha Eun. The series adapted from the novel of the same name written by Jung Eun-gwol is a fantasy romance historical drama about the only female painter in fictional era Dan dynasty, who was briefly recorded in the historical records.

It premiered on SBS TV on August 30, 2021, and aired every Monday and Tuesday at 22:00 (KST) for 16 episodes.

Synopsis

Set during the Dan dynasty era when ghosts, demons and gods are involved in human life, the story recounts the fateful relationship of a female painter (Kim Yoo-jung) and a blind astrologer (Ahn Hyo-seop). It begins at the sealing ceremony conducted at the 3rd year of King Seongjo's rule where they try to extract Ma Wang (Demon King: god of Death), who is residing in former King Yeongjong's body, and seal it inside a portrait of the King painted by a divine painter. Though they manage to seal the Demon King successfully with the help of Samshin (goddesses of Life), the Demon King places a curse on the country that it will suffer from droughts and famine for years to come. He also curses the offspring of Ha Seong-jin (the officer who conducted the sealing ceremony) and Hong Eun-ho (the painter of the King's portrait). Both Ha Seong-jin's son, Ha Ram, and Hong Eun-ho's daughter, Hong Cheon-gi, are born on that very day. Cheon-gi is born blind due to the curse of Demon King.

Nine years later, the country has been suffering from severe drought and the royal shaman is preparing for the Dragon Rain Making Ritual. Ha Ram, as a child born with the energy of water, is noticed by her and she chooses him as the helper of rain making ritual. As they come to the capital to attend the ritual, Ha Ram meets blind Hong Cheon-gi who lives with her father, who had lost his sanity after the sealing ceremony. The two children make memories with each other and promise to meet again after the rain ritual. But, unexpected things happen at the ritual. The King's portrait in which the Demon King is sealed gets burned and the Demon King enters Ha Ram's body. Ha Ram who was sacrificed in order to make rain, comes back to life with his sight lost while Cheon-gi miraculously gains her sight since Samshin takes the Demon King's eyes and leaves them with Cheon-gi.

Now, 19 years later Hong Cheon-gi is a talented painter at Baek-yoo Painting Group and the only female painter of that time. She copies valuable paintings to make money for her father's medicine. Ha Ram has become an astrologer at Seomungwan: government office in charge of astronomy, weather and calendar. He is capable of predicting the future by tracing the movement of stars. He also lives a  disguised life as Ilwolseong: the chief of information organization Wolseongdang in order to take revenge on the royal family who had destroyed his family 19 years ago.

After Hong Cheon-gi and Ha Ram reunite, they fall for each other, but the duo is sucked into the machinations of the royal court, particularly those involving two princes: the free-spirited Prince Yangmyeong (Gong Myung) and the cruel, scheming Prince Juhyang (Kwak Si-yang) – a man who longs to become the next king. Their relationship is further disturbed because one of them (Ha Ram) is possessed by the Demon and the other one (Hong Cheon-gi) is the divine painter tasked with making the vessel in which the Demon must be sealed.

Cast

Main
 Kim Yoo-jung as Hong Cheon-gi
 Lee Nam-kyung as young Hong Cheon-gi
 A genius female painter with divine power; she was born blind due to the curse of the Demon King, but miraculously open her eyes by God's blessing. She takes care of her mentally-ill father and copies valuable paintings to buy his medicine.
 Ahn Hyo-seop as Ha Ram (Ilwolseong)
 Choi Seung-hoon as young Ha Ram
 A red-eyed man who lost his sight due to the unknown accident while attending a rain making ritual in his childhood. He survived by the power of the Demon King, and lives a new life as an astrologer, while preparing to take revenge on royal family who are responsible for making his life miserable.
 Gong Myung as Grand Prince Yangmyeong (Yi Yul)
 Kim Jung-cheol as young Grand Prince Yangmyeong
 The third son of King Seongjo, a leisurely prince who is known to be an expert at painting, calligraphy and poetry. He seems to have a free spirit that is full of romantic qualities, but also has a deep sense of loneliness inside.
 Kwak Si-yang as Grand Prince Juhyang (Yi Hu)
 Park Sang-hoon as young Grand Prince Juhyang
 The second son of King Seongjo, a man who wishes the throne he can not have. In order to become a powerful king, he wants to get possessed by the Demon King.

Supporting

People around Hong Cheon-gi
 Choi Kwang-il as Hong Eun-ho
 Hong Cheon-gi's father, a former painter at Gohwawon (Royal Painting Bureau) who lost consciousness from a major event 19 years ago.
 Kim Kwang-kyu as Choi Won-ho
 Head Master of Beak-yoo Painting Society who cares of Hong Cheon-gi as his own daughter.
Yoon Sa-bong as Kyun-ju
 The person in charge of housekeeping of the Baek-yoo Painting Group. She treats Hong Cheon-gi like her daughter.
 Hong Kyung as Choi Jung
 He is the most famous painter in Gohwawon and has a talent for painting portraits.
 Hong Jin-ki as Cha Young-wook
 Cheon-gi's best friend and fellow painter at Baek-yoo Painting Group

People around Ha Ram
 Kim Hyun-mok as Mansoo
 Ha Ram's servant
 Song Won-seok as Moo-yeong
 Ha Ram's escort warrior who owns martial arts. A person who exists like a shadow, protecting Haram with the grace he received from him in the past.
 Ha Yu-li as Mae-hyang
 A gisaeng who helps Ilwolseong of Wolseongdang.

People around Prince Yangmyeong
 Jo Sung-ha as King Seongjo
 The 4th King of the Dan Dynasty
 Ko Kyu-pil as Go Pil
 Prince Yangmyeong's servant
 Jang Hyun-sung as  Han Geon
 A master of landscape and scenery painting and an expert at Gohwawon.
 Kim Joo-young as  Lee Hyun-mo
 A government official and Prince Yangmyeong's ally.

People around Prince Juhyang
 Chae Kook-hee as Mi-su
 She was once the chief royal shaman, Seongjucheong's 4th head priestess, but got banished from the palace and now works for prince Juhyang.
 Jung Dong-geun as Ahn Young-hoe
 Prince Juhyang's adviser.
 Cha Ji-hyuk as Prince Juhyang's escort warrior

Gods and Deities
 Moon Sook as Samshin
 Goddesses of life who protects Ha Ram and Hong Cheon-gi.
 Jo Ye-rin as Ho Ryeong
 The Tiger Spirit of mount Inwang, the guardian deity of King's Palace.
 Park Jung-hak as Gan Yun-guk/Hwacha
 Former Gohwawon expert who got possessed by Hwacha: goblin who lives on the energy of paintings.

Others
 Kim Geum-soon as Wol-seon
 Current chief royal shaman, Seongjucheong's 5th head priestess
 Jang Won-hyung as Shim Dae-yu
 A mysterious painter who always wears a bamboo hat, thus getting the name "Shim with Bamboo hat".
 Kwak Hyeon-jun as Kang Hee-yeon
 A painter from a wealthy aristocratic family.

Special appearance 
 Han Sang-jin as Ha Seong-jin, Ha-ram's father, former chief officer of the Martial.
 Jeon Guk-hwan as King Yeongjong, the 3rd King of Dan Dynasty
 Kim Beob-rae as Ma Wang: the Demon King (voice appearance)
 Choi Jong-won as Ha Dam (Ep 11–12, 14–15)
 A mysterious prisoner at stone prison, later revealed to be Ha Ram's grandfather.

Production
 Originally, Park Yong-soon (director of Secret Mother) would direct the series.
 The first script reading of the cast was held in November 2020. On July 8, 2021, the site photos of script reading were released by the production.

Original soundtrack

Part 1

Part 2

Part 3

Part 4

Part 5

Part 6

Part 7

Part 8

Viewership

International Broadcast
In Southeast Asia and Hong Kong, the drama was broadcast on Viu as Viu Original series, premiered simultaneously with Korean broadcast.

In Taiwan, it was broadcast on GTV from April 11, 2022.

Awards and nominations

Notes

References

External links

  
 
 
 Lovers of the Red Sky at Daum 
 Lovers of the Red Sky at Naver 

Seoul Broadcasting System television dramas
Korean-language television shows
2021 South Korean television series debuts
2021 South Korean television series endings
South Korean fantasy television series
South Korean historical television series
Alternate history television series
Television series set in the Joseon dynasty
South Korean romance television series
Television shows based on South Korean novels
Television series by Studio S
South Korean pre-produced television series
Television shows about blind people
Korean-language Viu (streaming media) exclusive international distribution programming